The designation Dominion Government Ship (DGS) was applied to ships operated by the Government of Canada in its early decades when it was more widely known by the deprecated name Dominion of Canada.  The later designation, Canadian Government Ship, was used as early as the turn of the century.

References

Dominion Government Ships